The Dosan Ahn Chang-ho Memorial Hall is a museum in Seoul, South Korea.

See also
List of museums in South Korea

External links
Official site

Museums in Seoul